Khan Research Laboratories was a Pakistani first-class cricket side who played in the Quaid-e-Azam Trophy, and also competed in limited overs cricket. It was sponsored by Pakistani nuclear enrichment facility Khan Research Laboratories (KRL).

They have played first-class cricket since the 1997–98 season. After the completion of the 2016–17 Quaid-e-Azam Trophy, they had played 171 matches, with 61 wins, 40 losses and 70 draws. Their home ground is KRL Stadium in Rawalpindi.

In May 2019, Pakistan's Prime Minister Imran Khan revamped the domestic cricket structure in Pakistan, excluding departmental teams in favour of regional sides, therefore ending the participation of the team. The Pakistan Cricket Board (PCB) was criticised in removing departmental sides, with players voicing their concern to revive the teams.

Current squad 

 Players with international caps are listed in bold.

Honours
Quaid-i-Azam Trophy (Runner-up)
 2002/03
 2008/09
Patron's Trophy (Quadrangular Stage)
 2006/07
Patron's Trophy Grade II 
 1994/95 (Winner)
 1996/97 (Runner-up)
National One Day Cup Division Two (Runner-up)
 1999/2000
 2010/11
 2011/12

References

External links
 Khan Research Laboratories at CricketArchive

1997 establishments in Pakistan
Pakistani first-class cricket teams
Cricket clubs established in 1997